The Rathcoole ambush was an ambush carried out by the Irish Republican Army (IRA) near the village of Rathcoole in County Cork on 16 June 1921 during the Irish War of Independence. Under the command of Paddy O'Brien, the IRA's 2nd Cork Brigade attacked an armed convoy of the Auxiliary Division returning to their barracks in Millstreet after collecting supplies. After 50 minutes of intense fighting, the IRA managed to inflict heavy casualties on the Auxiliaries before a shortage of ammunition forced them to withdraw.

Background
After the railway line leading to Millstreet had been cut by the IRA in several different places, the Auxiliary Division's L Company stationed in Mount Leader House were forced to travel in convoys to the railway station in Banteer to collect their supplies. Each convoy was escorted by armoured cars with the Crossley tenders each carrying a Lewis gun to provide further protection. As many roads and bridges in the area had been sabotaged by the IRA, the only route the Auxiliaries could take was the Millstreet–Banteer road. In May, following a meeting by the leaders of the 2nd Cork Brigade's Millstreet battalion, the republicans decided to ambush the convoy.

After monitoring the route for 12 days and recording the Auxiliaries movements, the IRA noticed that the size and strength of the convoy could vary each trip, with the smallest composed of 2 Crossley tenders carrying 20 personnel and the largest consisting of 6 vehicles and 40 men. Due to the presence of armoured cars and the possibility of facing a British convoy at full strength, the IRA decided to use mines for the operation. As armoured cars were beginning to see more extensive use by Crown forces, the column had been training their men throughout the Spring in the manufacturing and deployment of mines as a means of countering them. 16 June was chosen as the day for the attack as the republicans believed the British would make two trips that day. It was also decided that they would only attack the second convoy returning in the evening, as the setting sun would allow the column to successfully withdraw.

The IRA chose a site along the Millstreet−Banteer road about a mile from the village of Rathcoole. The site gave the IRA an advantageous position; to the south of the road was an elevated position, which could provide the volunteers with natural cover, and a pine wood that would allow them to observe the Auxiliaries without being spotted.
On 14 June, the IRA commanders sent messages to the brigade's other battalions in Newmarket, Kanturk, Mallow and Charleville requesting that they send all available men to the Rathcoole area. After the battalions had assembled the following day, the IRA force commanded by Paddy O'Brien numbered 140 men armed with rifles, shotguns and a Hotchkiss machine gun. Parts of the column also worked on creating barricades which were to be used as road blocks once the engagement commenced.

Ambush
On the morning of 16 June, the IRA laid 6 5–7 pound mines along the road, spacing each one about 150 yards apart. At around 10:30 a.m., the first of the 2 convoy was sighted, but was allowed to pass without incident. The British again drove through the ambush site at about 4:30 p.m.; the convoy  consisted of 3 Crossley tenders with an armoured Lancia leading at the front and carried 25 personnel. At 5 p.m., the volunteers moved to their positions in preparation for the convoy's return. O'Brien divided the column into 10 sections: 8 of the sections were situated in the hill and woods overlooking the road, with the remaining 2 assigned to the north to prevent the British from taking cover behind the stonewalls. 6 of the southern sections and 1 from the north covered each mine along the road with the remaining sections assigned to protect the flanks. The IRA planned to have each section to target a certain vehicle, this way they could pin down each of the lorries and prevent the Auxiliaries from consolidating and fighting as a whole unit.

When the Auxiliaries arrived back at the area on their return trip, the volunteers held off from attacking the first 3 lorries in the convoy and waited until the fourth vehicle had reached the sixth mine. Once the Crossley tender was in position, the mine was detonated; however, due to the ground being too soft, the blast was absorbed and only disabled the vehicle. The volunteers immediately opened fire on the stricken lorry, pinning down the Auxiliaries and preventing them from leaving their vehicle. The IRA also opened fire with their Hotchkiss machine gun, though they were later forced to disuse it due to jamming. At the same time, the Lancia, which was travelling at the front of the convoy, turned around to provide assistance, but was also disabled after it drove over another mine. The volunteers then attempted to assault the fourth lorry, but were forced back by machine gunfire from the third lorry.

Despite being taken completely by surprise, the Auxiliaries managed to form defensive positions by taking cover in and around their vehicles. They immediately began firing towards the IRA's positions with their Lewis gums, but due the terrain providing the volunteers with natural protection they failed to inflict any casualties. However, due to the intensity of the machine gun fire, the IRA were not able to advance beyond their positions. Attempting to outflank the republican positions, a group of 5 Auxiliaries from the third lorry left their vehicle and began making their way up the road. Upon seeing this, the volunteers set off another of their mines as the Auxiliaries were passing over it, incapacitating 3 of them. The remaining 2 men who weren't affected by the blast began firing towards IRA before both of them were eventually shot.

After recognising the precarious situation he was faced with, the commander of the convoy William Edward Crossey ordered one of his men, Francis Scott, to run back to their barracks in Millstreet and alert the rest of their company. Despite coming under heavy gunfire during the initial part of his journey, Scott managed to reach Mount Leader House and reinforcements were immediately sent to relieve the convoy. However, whilst driving to the ambush site, the relief force found that the road was blocked by 3 cut down trees. Subsequently, some of the men then began making their way on foot but would arrive after the ambush had ended.

At around this time, the IRA's supply of ammunition was becoming exhausted as each man only carried 40 rounds with them. After around 50 minutes of fighting, the republicans disengaged and began making their way along pre-planned lines of retreat. British reports at the time attributed the IRA's withdrawal to an aircraft which was flying nearby; however, most republican sources do make any mention of a plane. Out of the 25 men that were in the convoy, the Auxiliaries suffered 16 casualties, of which 2 were killed and 14  wounded. The IRA on the other hand did not suffer a single casualty. For their actions during the ambush, constables Crossey and Scott as well as William Kay and Henry W. T. George were awarded the Constabulary Medal.

Aftermath
The IRA considered the ambush to be a success. In an article for An Cosantóir, Paddy O'Brien wrote of the ambush that: 

The following day, an IRA detachment sent to the ambush site to retrieve the undetonated mines managed to recover 1,350 rounds of ammunition which had been abandoned by the Auxiliaries whilst they were clearing up the area. This was beneficial has they were able to replenish their ammunition stocks which they had depleted during the ambush.

Despite suffering heavy casualties, Crossey was pleased with how his men performed during the ambush. In his after action report, Crossey stated:

On 24 June, about a 1,000 British troops from the towns of Macroom, Kanturk, Tralee, Ballincollig, Ballyvonaire, Buttevant and Killarney carried out large scale searches around the Rathcoole area. On the same day, the Auxiliaries arrested and killed IRA volunteer Michael Dineen. According to IRA accounts, Dineen was reportedly tortured by the Auxiliaries  before having some his bones broken and being repeatedly shot. On 1 July, Auxiliaries shot dead Bernard Moynihan, another volunteer, and burned down Rathcoole wood. The IRA then began making plans for an attack on Mount Leader House, but these were postponed due the announcement of the truce on 11 July.

References

Notes

Citations

Bibliography

External links
 IRA witness statements about the ambush on theauxiliaries.com

Military actions and engagements during the Irish War of Independence
1921 in Ireland
Ambushes in Europe
History of County Cork
June 1921 events
Royal Irish Constabulary